The Abdeen Palace Incident was a military confrontation that took place on 4 February 1942 at Abdeen Palace in Cairo, and almost resulted in the forced abdication of King Farouk I. It is considered a landmark in the history of Egypt.

Following a ministerial crisis in February 1942, the British government, through its ambassador in Egypt, Sir Miles Lampson, pressed Farouk to have a Wafd or Wafd-coalition government replace Hussein Sirri Pasha's government. This reversal of long-standing opposition to the Wafd came from the British belief that the Wafd, still the most popular of the Egyptian political parties, would be more effective in gaining public support in Egypt for the British war effort than any of the other parties. It was also hoped that a Wafd government would weaken the influence of the pro-Axis elements around King Farouk. Lampson eventually decided to force this choice on Farouk by insisting that he abdicate unless he agreed to ask the Wafd leader, Mustafa el-Nahhas, to form a government. Lampson sought and finally gained the support of Oliver Lyttelton in the British cabinet to apply pressure on the Egyptian King.

On the night of 4 February 1942, General Robert Stone surrounded Abdeen Palace in Cairo with troops and tanks, and Lampson presented Farouk with an abdication decree drafted by Sir Walter Monckton. Farouk capitulated, and Nahhas formed a government shortly thereafter. However, the humiliation meted out to Farouk and the actions of the Wafd in cooperating with the British and taking power, lost support for both the British and the Wafd among both civilians and, more importantly, the Egyptian military. In his memoirs, Muhammad Naguib, one of the leaders of the Egyptian Revolution of 1952, and Egypt's first President, cited the incident as a major factor in the rise of revolutionary, anti-monarchical sentiment in the country that contributed to the revolution 10 years later.

See also
Egypt in World War II

References

External links

1942 in Egypt
Military history of Cairo
History of Egypt (1900–present)
Egypt in World War II
Egypt–United Kingdom relations
Farouk of Egypt
Downtown Cairo
World War II sites in Egypt
1940s in Cairo
1942 in military history
1942 in politics
February 1942 events